Darien is a coastal town in Fairfield County, Connecticut, United States. With a population of 21,499 and a land area of just under 13 square miles, it is the smallest town on Connecticut's Gold Coast. It has the youngest population of any non-college town in Connecticut, a high rate of marriage, and high number of average children per household. 

Situated on Long Island Sound between the cities of Stamford and Norwalk, the town has relatively few office buildings. Many residents commute to Manhattan, with two Metro-North railroad stations - Noroton Heights and Darien - linking the town to Grand Central Terminal. For recreation, the town boasts eleven parks, two public beaches, the private Tokeneke beach club, three country clubs including the first organized golf club in Connecticut, a riding & racquet club, the public Darien Boat Club, and Noroton Yacht Club.

History

According to early records, the first clearings of land were made by men from the New Haven and Wethersfield colonies and from Norwalk in about 1641. It was not until 1739, however, that the Middlesex Society of the Town of Stamford built the first community church, now the First Congregational Church of Darien (which stands on the original site at the corner of Brookside Road and the Boston Post Road).

Tories raided the town several times during the Revolution, at one point taking 26 men in the parish prisoner for five months, including the Reverend Moses Mather, pastor of the parish. The Loyalist-Patriot conflict in Darien is the setting for the novel Tory Hole, the first book by children's author Louise Hall Tharp. Middlesex Parish was incorporated as the Town of Darien in 1820.

According to the Darien Historical Society, the name Darien was decided upon when the residents of the town could not agree on a name to replace Middlesex Parish, many families wanting it to be named after themselves. Some proposed naming the town "Belleville" in honor of Thaddeus Bell, a veteran of the revolutionary war. He apparently rejected the honor while supporting the Darien option. A sailor who had traveled to Isthmus of Darien, then part of the Spanish Empire, suggested the name Darien, which was eventually adopted by the people of the town. The town name is pronounced  (like "Dairy-Ann"), with stress on the last syllable, and has been referred to as such at least as far back as 1913. Residents say this is still the proper pronunciation. "You can always tell when someone is not from here, because they do pronounce it the way it's spelled," Louise Berry, director of the town library, said in a 2006 interview.

Darien was mostly white Protestant through the middle of the twentieth century. In the twenty-first century, Darien is a multi-ethnic town with residents of many religions and backgrounds, although still overwhelmingly white. One of seven households report speaking a language other than English at home. Previously, however, Darien had a narrower racial and religious culture. The town's exclusionary policies in the early 20th century were similar to many segregated suburbs at that time, including Beverly Hills, California and Tuxedo Park, New York. There were events involving anti-Black racism and anti-Semitism in the 1930s and 1940s, with Darien being a prototypical sundown town. Laura Hobson's novel Gentleman's Agreement centered on antisemitism in Darien, in neighboring towns, and among the WASP culture of the era.

Darien is one of the few municipalities in Connecticut that comply with the State's mandate to report the racial and ethnic makeup of people stopped by the police. 82% of the people stopped are white, 12% are Black, and 15% are Hispanic.

Geography

The town has four exits on the northbound-traffic side of Interstate 95 (Exits 10–13) and three on the southbound-traffic side (where there is no Exit 12). Its northern border is just south of the historic Merritt Parkway, where Exits 36 and 37 are closest to the town. It also has two Metro-North railroad stations for commuter trains into New York City, with a  commute of 46–50 minutes from Noroton Heights and 49–53 minutes from Darien. In addition, the Glenbrook railroad station and the Talmadge Hill railroad station, both on the New Canaan Branch, are within walking distance of homes near the Holmes elementary school and at the far northwestern corner of town. The Rowayton railroad station on the New Haven Line is also within walking distance of homes near Raymond Street in the southeastern part of town. Most trains run non-stop after Stamford into New York City's 125th Street, then Grand Central Terminal. Along with the New Haven Line of Metro-North Railroad and Interstate 95, US Route 1, known locally as the Boston Post Road, or, more commonly, the Post Road, runs east–west through the southern side of town. Except for the Noroton Heights business district, commercial zoning is extremely limited outside of the town-wide strip along the Post Road.

Darien is bordered on the west by Stamford, on the north by New Canaan, and on the east by Norwalk. On the south it faces Long Island Sound and the North Shore of Long Island. It is part of the "panhandle" of Connecticut jutting into New York state. The town has  of coastline and five harbors.

Sections of the town

In addition to some small neighborhoods, the larger divisions of the town are Downtown Darien (area surrounding Boston Post Road from I-95 to Brookside Road), Noroton (roughly in the southwest corner of town on Boston Post Road), Ox Ridge (northern end of Mansfield Avenue), Noroton Heights (roughly north of Interstate 95 to Middlesex Middle School with an eastern boundary of Noroton Avenue), Springdale (adjacent to Stamford's Springdale neighborhood), Long Neck Point (southernmost part of town up to historic Ring's End Landing) and Tokeneke (mostly private community in the southeastern end of town).

The name Noroton originates from the Native American "Norporiton". Long Neck includes Long Neck Point which provides westerly views of Manhattan. Though the general geographic reference to this land feature is Long Neck Point, therein are two different neighborhoods, each with their own main road and distinct features.

A key part of Connecticut's Gold Coast, Long Neck Point is consistently ranked one of the best places to live in America. In 1902 during the Gilded Age, Anson Phelps Stokes of the Stokes family built an elegant Georgian manor on the point, dubbed "Brick House" which was later occupied by Andrew Carnegie. Brick House was later run as the Convent of the Sacred Heart before it was split in half and sold as two private residences. The property on the tip was divided in two and neither home can rise above 20 feet. Historically, it has also been called Collender's Point and "La Belle" Point.

On its east side, Long Neck Point Road stretches south beginning near the Ring's End Landing bridge and terminating at the southerly most tip of land. This area is somewhat inland and away from the eastern shoreline and at a relatively high elevation above the water. The west coast of Long Neck runs along Goodwives River and includes Pear Tree Point. Situated on Noroton Harbor, Pear Tree Point includes a public beach (Pear Tree Point Beach Park) and a private club (Darien Boat Club). Pear Tree Point Road, begins at the Ring's End Landing bridge, runs south along the western side of Long Neck adjacent to "The Gut" and to outer Noroton Harbor. This charming route hugs the shoreline at an elevation close enough to the tides such that storm conditions can bring the water level over the road. Approximately half-way south along the peninsula, Pear Tree Point Road turns abruptly to the east, ninety degrees, heading uphill and connecting to Long Neck Point Road, distinguishing Long Neck from Long Neck Point.

The large island to the east is the remaining estate of the late William Ziegler. The Ziegler Estate was at one point the most expensive waterfront plot on the eastern seaboard, listed for $175M. With thousands of feet of direct undeveloped waterfront, it has the fourth largest property tax in town. In 2016 the 63-acre portion of the estate known as Great Island was listed for sale. The island was approved for purchase by the town in June 2022 for $103M.

Darien's eastern coastline is almost entirely Tokeneke, a private community with a beach, club, and police patrol. Tokeneke is a private neighborhood and tax district established in January 1957. All homeowners within the district pay a separate tax to maintain the roads and police constables in the neighborhood. Coveted Contentment Island sits in the southeasternmost part of town, encompassed by Tokeneke.

Noroton Heights "blew up around the Noroton Heights train station and housed the European immigrants who serviced the old estates," according to an article about the community in The New York Times. The densely populated streets of this part of town are full of "modest Capes and colonials" along with other house styles.

Climate

Darien has a humid continental climate, similar to that of New York City, with warm to hot summers and cold winters. The highest recorded temperature was 103 °F (39 °C) in July 1966, while the lowest recorded temperature was −15 °F (−26 °C) in 1968. Snowfall is generally frequent in winter while average precipitation is most common in September.

Demographics

As of the census of 2000, there were 19,607 people, 6,592 households, and 5,385 families residing in the town. There were 6,792 housing units at an average density of 203.9 inhabitants/km2 (528.3 persons/sq mi). The racial makeup of the town was 95.97% White, 0.45% African American, 0.04% Native American, 2.42% Asian, 0.03% Pacific Islander, 0.30% from other races, and 0.80% from two or more races. Hispanic or Latino of any race were 2.19% of the population.

There were 6,592 households, out of which 46.4% had children under the age of 18 living with them, 74.5% were married couples living together, 5.6% had a woman whose husband did not live with her, and 18.3% were non-families. Of all households 15.6% were made up of individuals, and 8.3% had someone living alone who was 65 years of age or older. The average household size was 2.95 and the average family size was 3.31.

In the town, the population was spread out, with 32.5% under the age of 18, 3.0% from 18 to 24, 28.2% from 25 to 44, 24.0% from 45 to 64, and 12.4% who were 65 years of age or older. The median age was 38 years. For every 100 females, there were 96.2 males. For every 100 females age 18 and over, there were 89.7 males.

In 2019, the median household income was $232,523 and the per capita income for the town was $116,564.

Darien has been ranked the #1 safest "city" in Connecticut for 2018 by Safewise, and the 54th safest city in the United States.

Economy

JetBlue Airways once had its finance and scheduling operations at 19 Old Kings Highway South in Darien. In mid-2012 JetBlue combined the Darien and Forest Hills, Queens, New York City headquarters into its headquarters in Long Island City, Queens.

Arts and culture

Annual events

February – Valentine's Day Dessert Wars "Something Sweet" (Darien Parks and Recreation)
March – Holly Pond School book fair at Darien YMCA
March – Community Arts Festival at Town Hall
March – Darien Dash (Darien Youth Commission) scavenger hunt
March – Daddy Daughter Dance at Town Hall
April – Darien Nature Center Earth Day Celebration
April – Lawn Easter Egg Hunt Darien Community Association
May – Boy Scout Troop 35 and 53 Tag Sale
May – Hindley Happening Fair
May – Tilley Pond Model Boat Regatta
May through November- Darien Farmer's Market outdoors at the Goodwives Shopping Center
May – Post 53 Food Fair at Tilly Pond Park and Memorial Day Parade
June - Darien Pride Festival at Tilly Pond Park
June – Weed Beach Fest- a celebration that brings the community together for music, food and fun in the sun
June – Weed Beach Family Concert Series
June through September – Darien Summer Nights at Grove Street Plaza & Tilley Pond Park
July – annual Sidewalk Sale (Darien Chamber of Commerce)
September – Artists at Grove Street Plaza Outdoor Arts Fair 
October – Downtown Halloween Parade (Darien Community Association)
October – Halloween Family Fest (Darien Arts Center)
October – Tokeneke Pumpkin Carnival
October – Halloween Hoot and Howl (Darien Nature Center)
October – Post 53 Annual Haunted House
October – Halloween Window Painting downtown
December – Mother/Daughter Nutcracker Tea (Darien Community Association)
December – Holiday Scavenger Hunt
December – Traditional town tree lighting ceremony hosted by the Darien Sport Shop
December – An Old Fashioned Holiday festival at Tilley Pond Park
December – Holiday Magic at Grove Street Plaza
December – Candlelight Christmas caroling sing-along sponsored by The Friends of Gorham's Pond; residents only

Library

The library has existed in Darien as an institution since 1894, primarily in locations on the Post Rd (four sites including the current site), as well as a location just off the Post Road, on Leroy Avenue (which currently houses the Darien Board of Education). Andrew Carnegie offered funds for a library, but he was turned down by the town. The Darien Library is the most heavily utilized library in Connecticut. It has consistently ranked in the top ten of its category in the HAPLR (Hennen's American Public Library Ratings) Index of libraries. In 2012, it was named a Five Star library by Library Journal, which used four objective measures: visits, circulation, program attendance and internet computer use per capita to compare the level of services libraries provide to their communities. The current building was funded over a three-year capital campaign, with town residents backing the initiative. 1,800 families contributed to the capital campaign. The Library is built to the LEED Gold certified standard.

Landmarks

 The Convent of St. Birgitta
 A notable work of modern architecture in town is the Frederick J. Smith House, designed by architect Richard Meier. The house was planned starting in 1965 and completed in 1967. The home has been featured in numerous books. "There is a formal layering, giving a sense of progression, as one moves across the site from the entrance road down to the shore, and the 'line of progression' determines the major site axis," said Richard Meier. "Perpendicular to this axis, the intersecting planes in the house respond to the rhythms of the slope, trees, rock outcroppings, and the shoreline."
 The Mather Homestead, a National Historic Landmark and on the National Register of Historic Places. The home was built during the Revolutionary War, and is considered one of the finest examples of 18th century architecture, with a wood frame structure and two stories plus a basement and attic. Stephen Mather owned the home, the founder and first Director of the National Park Service.
 The Darien Historical Society

Parks and recreation

Recreation

Darien Y – the local YMCA offers more than 300 programs. It houses the Holly Pond Nursery School and features two pools and workout facilities overlooking Holly Pond. The facility completed a major $9M renovation in 2012, adding a large modern entry hall with a cafe, a new wing to house the nursery school, a 10,000 square foot gymnastics wing with a ceiling made of wood trusses and an observation deck, a spin studio, and a "Mind, Body Studio" for yoga. The project took 5 years to complete due to delays "after a long series of hearings before the town Planning & Zoning Commission."
YWCA of Darien-Norwalk is located in Darien.
The Depot – an adult-supervised youth center for town teenagers, located in the former Noroton Heights Railroad Station building since the organization's founding in 1989. A student board runs the day-to-day programming; an adult board focuses on fundraising, operations management and capital building projects.
Darien Ice House – Darien's sole ice rink.
Darien Playhouse – Darien's sole commercial cinema.

Parks and beaches

Weed Beach –  at 155 Nearwater Lane, Noroton. The park includes a bathing area, picnic areas, 6 tennis courts, 5 paddle tennis courts, children's play areas, a bathhouse, a fit trail with equipment, a fully operational concession stand, the Paddle Tennis warming hut, and is home to Darien Junior Sailing Team. The public beach is restricted to Darien residents only in the summer months, with visitor passes available for a fee. The town acquired an acre of waterfront land adjacent to Weed beach and cleared it in 2018, adding to the park.

Pear Tree Point Beach –  at 127 Pear Tree Point Road. Pear Tree Point Beach encompasses approximately 8 acres off Pear Tree Point Road at the mouth of the Goodwives River. The beach offers a bathing area, handicap accessible picnic area with picnic tables and grills, a gazebo, a bathhouse, fully operational concession stand, a boat launch ramp, and two beaches. In addition, the Darien Boat Club is located at this beach. The public beach is restricted to Darien residents only in the summer months, with visitor passes available for a fee.
Cherry Lawn Park – , 120 Brookside Road, in Cherry Lawn Park. Fields, ponds, and trails surround the property. The Darien Land Trust's 3 acre Cherry Lawn property is adjacent, located behind the nature center. The pond is available for winter ice skating with conditions monitored by the town Parks & Recreation department.
Highland Farm –  on Middlesex Road, a dawn-to-dusk public recreation facility with a half-mile walking loop (and the first ADA compliant walking loop in the town of Darien), formerly part of the private Ox Ridge Hunt Club
Great Island – , the remaining shoreline estate of the late William Ziegler was approved for purchase by the town in June 2022 for $103M. Formerly one of the largest private parcels of waterfront land in the region, The Ziegler Estate was one of the most expensive waterfront plots on the eastern seaboard listed for $175M. The island on Long Neck Point peninsula has beaches and a deepwater dock along its mile-long coastline. The centerpiece of the estate is a two-story, 13,000-square-foot stone manor. The property also features an equestrian facility (built by Rafael Guastavino) that features vaulted, tiled ceilings reminiscent of one of Guastavino’s better-known projects, Grand Central Terminal, a granite stable with 18 stalls and an indoor riding arena. The estate also has a guest house, a caretaker’s cottage, a farmhouse, a seaside cottage, a polo field and riding trails. Town officials had discussed several ideas for the property- such as a skating rink or venues for museums or festivals, but some RTM members have discussed keeping the space as open and undeveloped as possible.
Woodland Park Nature Preserve –  on Middlesex Road
Baker Park –  at 75 Noroton Ave (former site of the Baker School).
Frate Park –  at the corner of Middlesex Road and Leroy Avenue.
McGuane Park –  at 221 Noroton Ave.
Selleck's Woods Nature Preserve –  on Little Brook Road. Selleck's Woods has densely wooded areas, two ponds, marshes, swamps, streams, and several prairie pockets throughout the park. The Darien Land Trust's 22-acre Dunlap Woods is adjacent to Selleck's Woods.
Stony Brook Park –  on Ledge Road.
Town Hall and Holahan Fields –  at 2 Renshaw Road.
Tilley Pond Park –  on Lakeside Avenue. The pond is available for winter ice skating with conditions monitored by the town Parks & Recreation department.
Gorham Pond – a watershed very popular with Darien residents in the winter months for open-air ice skating and hockey, creating a bucolic Currier & Ives scene.
Darien Community Association bird sanctuary- nearly four acres of woodland, open to the public behind the historic Meadowlands manor at 274 Middlesex Road.

Private membership clubs

Noroton Yacht Club – , members included Bruce Kirby, designer of the Laser dinghy. The club runs the largest junior sailing program in the county. The club was founded in 1928 and built its first clubhouse the following year. It was replaced in 2017.

Boy Scouts

Darien has many active scout units, including two Boy Scout troops, a Boy Scout Ship, and Explorer Post 53, one Girls troop as well as three Cub Scout packs.

Government and Politics

Elected bodies in the town government are a five-member Board of Selectmen, a nine-member Board of Education, a seven-member Board of Finance, a six-member Planning and Zoning Commission, three-member Board of Assessment Appeals, and a 100-member, nonpartisan Representative Town Meeting. The town has several elective offices as well: the town clerk, probate judge, registrar of voters, tax collector and treasurer.

The Board of Finance approves financial measures, including the town budget; the Board of Education controls the town's public schools; the Representative Town Meeting is the main legislative body of the town.

At the federal level, Darien is included in Connecticut's 4th congressional district and is currently represented by Democrat Jim Himes.

Presidential election results

Historically, Darien has been a solidly Republican town; but in 2016, in spite of the Republican climate nationwide, Hillary Rodham Clinton became the first Democrat to win in Darien since 1888 when Grover Cleveland beat Benjamin Harrison by two votes. The pattern resembled one in suburban areas across the country that swung hard into the Democratic column due to the Republican Party being increasingly dominated by Donald Trump and right-wing populism which alienated the more moderate base, a trend referred to as the suburban revolt. In 2020, this trend continued, with Democrat and former Vice President Joe Biden winning over 60% of the vote and U.S. Representative Jim Himes winning it for the first time in his political career.

Darien was one of only five towns in Connecticut that backed former Ohio Governor John Kasich over Donald Trump in the 2016 Republican presidential primary. Kasich received 1,284 votes (48.89%), ahead of Trump who garnered 1,070 votes (41.54 percent) and U.S. Senator Ted Cruz of Texas with 186 votes (7.22 percent). In the Democratic primary, Hillary Clinton won 832 votes (69.51%) in Darien, far ahead of self-described democratic socialist U.S. Senator Bernie Sanders of Vermont with 363 votes (30.33%), reflecting the town’s moderate political identity.

Taxes 

Darien has the lowest property taxes of the Fairfield County suburbs of its size, with a mill rate of 15.35 being consistently lower than New Canaan at 15.985 and Westport at 18.09 (rates ).

Environmental sustainability 

The town of Darien is part of "Sustainable Fairfield County"—a cooperative organization made up of ten Fairfield County communities that have joined forces to help advance environmental sustainability and responsibility county-wide. The other municipalities include Easton, Fairfield, Greenwich, New Canaan, Norwalk, Trumbull, Weston, Westport and Wilton.

Education

Darien is served by the Darien Public Schools, and Darien High School was ranked No. 1 in the "U.S. News Best High Schools in Connecticut" in 2019. The school also ranked in the top 150 in the national rankings, and in the top 50 in STEM high schools in the United States. Darien has five elementary schools: Hindley School, Holmes School, Ox Ridge School, Royle School, and Tokeneke School. A $27 million addition was completed in 2000 to the town's middle school, Middlesex Middle School, and a new $73 million campus for Darien High School was completed in the fall of 2005. Darien sports teams go by the name of the "Blue Wave".

The Connecticut State Department of Education has ranked the Darien Public Schools district in its highest-rated District Reference Group, A (formerly the Educational Reference Group A), which consists of the nine most affluent and low-need-for-extra-assistance districts among the 162 school districts in Connecticut. Also included are the elite New Canaan, Westport, Wilton, Weston, Easton, Redding, and Ridgefield school districts.

In June 2012, 24/7 Wall St. ranked Darien as the 10th wealthiest school district in the United States.

Pear Tree Point School, originally named Plumfield School, was a private school on Long Neck, educating students in pre-kindergarten through Grade 5. The school was closed in summer 2018.

Media

Darien is served by a local print/online weeklies, the Darien Times, four exclusively online local news websites, Darienite, HamletHub Darien, the Darien Patch and The Daily Voice, Darien. A monthly magazine known as New Canaan and Darien Magazine is also published covering Darien, New Canaan, and Rowayton (a section of the city of Norwalk). Sound Watch Magazine. is another monthly publication, founded in 2019, dedicated to local news and history of the area. Most public meetings are filmed and broadcast live, and recorded for later broadcast by Cablevision's Channel 79 Government Access.

Film

Films at least partially filmed in Darien with release date include:

Gypsy (2017)
Hope Springs (2012)
Hello I Must Be Going (2012)
My Soul to Take (2010)
Birds of America (2008)
Revolutionary Road (2008)
The Big Wedding (2013)
The Life Before Her Eyes (2007)
The Stepford Wives (2004)
Cannonball Run II (1984)
The Stepford Wives (1975)
Gentleman's Agreement (1947) – based on a book by Laura Hobson that portrayed Darien as a restricted community that excludes Jews.
The Perfect Date (2019) – a young man obsessed with getting into Yale pretends to be from Darien to impress a wealthy Greenwich woman.

Infrastructure

Emergency services

Ambulance service

An ambulance service, known as "Darien EMS – Post 53" is the only ambulance service in the nation staffed and run entirely by high school student volunteers, covers one of the deadliest stretches of Interstate 95, and responds to over 1,500 emergency calls annually. The Explorer post is chartered under the Connecticut Yankee Council, and is considered a scouting unit. The service provides emergency care at no cost to the patient, funded entirely by private donations from town residents. Teenagers are allowed to perform patient care due to the fact that Connecticut is one of the few states in the nation which allows emergency medical technicians to be certified at age 16.

Students start training while they are in their freshman year of high school. They are elected by current members of Post and then they continue their training supervised by trained adults, Post 53 lets in 20 teenagers a year to join the crew, and includes boys and girls.

Fire Department

The town of Darien is protected by three independent all-volunteer fire departments in three fire districts.

Police Department

The Darien Police Department is composed of 51 sworn officers, 18 traffic agents, 12 civilian employees and is headquartered at 25 Hecker Avenue in Darien, CT. The Department maintains a fleet of 30 vehicles which includes 13 marked patrol units, a motorcycle, a 27-foot SAFEboat, a special services vehicle, undercover vehicles and administrative vehicles. The Department acts as the Public Safety Answering Point for all 911 and non-emergency Police, Fire and medical-related calls within the Town of Darien, CT.

Transportation

The town is served by two train stations, one in Noroton Heights and the other in downtown Darien. The Connecticut Turnpike (Interstate 95) runs through town, as does the Post Road, U.S. Route 1. Just to the north of town, the Merritt Parkway (Route 15) runs roughly parallel to the northern border between Darien and New Canaan. The Talmadge Hill railroad station is just north of the border as well. Along with the Post Road, major east–west thoroughfares in town are West Avenue and Middlesex Road. Major north–south roads are Hoyt Street, Hollow Tree Ridge Road, Nearwater Lane, Noroton Avenue, Middlesex Road, Mansfield Avenue and Brookside Road.

Interstate 95 has rest stops in Darien both for the southbound and northbound lanes. The state Department of Transportation has added "speed change" lanes between entrances and exits up to Exit 10 (and points westward). The phase of the highway widening from Exit 9 to Exit 10, at a cost of $7.5 million, was expected to be complete by October 2007, state Transportation officials said in August of that year. The state is in the process of planning more such lanes through the rest of the highway in town in a project expected to cost $24.5 million. About 150,000 vehicles pass Exit 12 each day, according to the state Department of Transportation. The state was closed the southbound entrance for Exit 12 in 2008 during work on the project.

Chapter 14 of English author Nigel Williams' 1994 travelogue From Wimbledon to Waco tells of his difficulties in reaching Darien from Interstate 95.

In December 2007 a 15-month, $5.5 million project was completed to add fourth (or "operational") lanes in each direction between the entrances and exits at Exits 10 and 11 in Darien. An earlier project added a fourth lane on the southbound side from the entrance at Exit 10 to Exit 8. After that lane was added, a state Department of Transportation study concluded that accidents were down on that stretch of the highway by 20 percent, amounting to about 160 fewer accidents per year.

Westchester County Airport is the closest commercial airport to Darien, with direct service to Chicago, Charlotte, Atlanta, West Palm Beach, Fort Myers, Orlando, Fort Lauderdale, Tampa, Pittsburgh, Detroit, and Washington DC. Seasonal service also exists to Nantucket, Martha's Vineyard, Hyannis, Vero Beach and Provincetown. It takes approximately 25 minutes to drive to from the town's center. This is followed by LaGuardia Airport in Queens, New York, a 45-minute drive from Darien. John F. Kennedy International Airport in Queens, New York, is the closest major international airport, a one-hour+ drive. Newark Liberty International Airport in New Jersey is also easily accessible from Darien, approximately one hour and 10 min away.

Notable people

Several people notable for their esteemed place in American history have called Darien home: Charles Lindbergh the late aviator, and his wife, author Anne Morrow Lindbergh lived at 21 Tokeneke Trail in a seaside cottage named Tellina. The cottage was positioned on the legendary aviators' favorite spot, a place where they had kept a trailer that had been a gift from friend Henry Ford. Steel magnate and philanthropist Andrew Carnegie vacationed for several summers at what became the Convent of the Sacred Heart (divided into many private estates in the 1970s) at Long Neck Point. Soong Mei-ling, First Lady of the Republic of China, rented a beach house on Noroton Bay many summers in the late 1970s. Christopher Shays, the former Republican congressman representing Connecticut's Fourth District, was born in Darien (and now lives in Bridgeport).

Actors and actresses who have lived in town include former resident Christopher Plummer,Alexandra Breckenridge, Kate Bosworth, Topher Grace, Chloë Sevigny, and Robert Downey Jr. Topher Grace notes chaperoning a field trip that Kate Bosworth was on and having been babysat by Chloë Sevigny. Actress Carol Kane attended Cherry Lawn School in Darien until 1965. Film director Gus Van Sant also went to high school in Darien. Jazz saxophonist Gerry Mulligan lived in Darien in later life and died there in 1996. Guitarist Chris Risola grew up in Darien. Musician Moby lived in Darien during his adolescence, and speaks of his interactions in town with Topher Grace, Chloë Sevigny, Robert De Niro, and Robert Downey Jr.

People famous in other fields have also called Darien home: Leslie Groves, military head of the Manhattan Project, lived in town after the project ended. Paul Manship, sculptor of the Prometheus figure at Rockefeller Center, spent summers living on Leroy Avenue and working on his art in the early 1930s. Photojournalist Margaret Bourke-White lived in town first with author Erskine Caldwell, then in the same home after their divorce. Helen Frankenthaler, a major American Abstract Expressionist painter, lived in Darien in later life and maintained her primary studio there. Novelist and playwright Richard Bissell lived in Darien from the early 1950s to the mid-1970s. Producer and NBC executive Grant Tinker reared his family there in the 1950s; Grant also co-founded MTM Enterprises and was married to Mary Tyler Moore. Former Benton & Bowles advertising agency executive and noted big band radio broadcaster G. Emerson Cole lived in Darien for 35 years. Kiss drummer Peter Criss once owned a home in Darien. Art deco artist and illustrator Major Felten spent most of his life in Darien. Emily Barringer (1876–1961), the world's first female ambulance surgeon and the first woman to secure a surgical residency, resided in Darien (and New Canaan) until her death. Founder of Lone Pine Capital Stephen Mandel (hedge fund manager) also grew up in Darien. Ice hockey goaltender Spencer Knight was born, and grew up here.

Current notable residents include New York Yankees General Manager Brian Cashman; Steve Wilkos, host of The Steve Wilkos Show; 60 Minutes correspondent and CBS Evening News anchor Scott Pelley, CNN host S. E. Cupp, and music executive Tommy Mottola. CNN anchor Ashleigh Banfield is a resident of Darien.

Other notable executive residents include Vineyard Vines CEO & founder Ian Murray, billionaire Ole Andreas Halvorsen, the CEO and a co-founder of Viking Global Investors, Anthony Noto, CEO of SoFi, and the former COO of Twitter,

Redevelopment projects

Downtown Darien

Baywater Properties (run by Darien resident, David Genovese, the developer responsible for high-end additions in downtown Darien), has proposed a new significant redevelopment of Downtown Darien in the area bounded by Post Road, Corbin Dr, I-95 and Old Kings Highway. The Corbin District will include upscale residences targeted to empty-nesters, and locally owned retailers. The project construction began in early 2020.

Noroton Heights 

The town's Planning and Zoning Commission approved two redevelopment project in the Noroton Heights district, one for a new Noroton Shopping Center proposed by the owners of Palmer's Market, and the other for a new development called The Commons, proposed by Federal Reality. Both projects will incorporate mixed-use development, bringing new apartments to the neighborhood while expanding the existing retail and restaurant space in the area. Noroton Heights has long been a target for redevelopment, with town officials identifying the neighborhood as a focus in the 2016 update of the Town Plan of Conservation and Development. One of the project's goals is to give the Noroton Heights area a new sense of place by redeveloping the area in the style of a village. This includes new public plaza spaces and a complete restructuring of the shopping center's traffic flow. Representatives for the shopping center have said the new village would have a pedestrian focus and seeks to capitalize on the proximity of the Noroton Heights train station. The area remains a priority for the town's infrastructure improvements with an ongoing access study being conducted by a consultant and the active replacement of the Noroton Heights train station platform. Department of Public Works Director Ed Gentile has said the town is still reviewing options to install a culvert and improve drainage in the area as well.

In popular culture

Literature

 Graham Masterton's novel Picture of Evil, also known as Family Portrait, was set, in part, in Darien, the home of the Gray family, which, like Dorian Gray in The Picture of Dorian Gray, remain young while their counterparts in a family portrait grow old.
 Laura Hobson's novel Gentleman's Agreement is set in Darien.
 Louise Hall Tharp's children's novel Tory Hole is set in American Revolutionary War era Darien.
 Orphan: First Kill, a prequel to the psychological horror film Orphan is set in Darien, 2007 and it follows Esther, the villain protagonist, who poses as the missing daughter of a wealthy family named the Albrights.

Citations

External links 

 Town of Darien website

 
Populated coastal places in Connecticut
Sundown towns in the United States
Towns in Connecticut
Towns in Fairfield County, Connecticut
Towns in the New York metropolitan area